The Stura di Demonte Valley (in Italian Valle Stura di Demonte) is a valley in south-west of Piedmont in the Province of Cuneo, Italy.

Etymology
The valley takes its name from the river Stura di Demonte, a left-hand tributary of the Tanaro which flows through the valley.

Geography
The municipalities of the valley are Aisone, Argentera, Borgo San Dalmazzo, Demonte, Gaiola, Moiola, Pietraporzio, Rittana, Roccasparvera, Sambuco, Valloriate and Vinadio.

Notable summits
Among the notable summits which surround the valley there are:

 Monte Tenibres - 3.031 m
 Cima di Corborant - 3.007 m
 Becco Alto d'Ischiator - 2.996 m
 Testa dell'Ubac - 2.991 m
 Enciastraia - 2.955 m
 Rocca dei Tre Vescovi - 2.867 m

Access
The valley can be reached by car/bus from the Po Plain following the strada statale nr. 21 della Maddalena, which ends with the Colle della Maddalena and connects the Valle Stura di Demonte with the Ubaye Valley (France).

Notes and references

External links

 http://www.vallestura.net/ 

Stura di Demonte
Stura di Demonte
Province of Cuneo